Tanza, officially the Municipality of Tanza, formerly known as Santa Cruz de Malabón, is a 1st class municipality in the province of Cavite, Philippines. According to the 2020 census, it has a population of 312,116 people.

Tanza was awarded the "Seal of Good Financial Housekeeping" in 2011, 2012, 2018, 2019 and 2021 and "Seal of Good Local Governance" in 2016 by the Department of the Interior and Local Government. The municipality was named 2014 most competitive in economic dynamism by National Competitiveness Council, eighth most populous municipality (2015 NSO Census) and 15th largest Municipality Revenue Earner based on 2016 Bureau of Local Government Finance Financial Report.

Tanza is the place where Emilio Aguinaldo had sworn as the president of the rebel government of the Philippines. Also in this town, is the birthplace of Felipe G. Calderon, the person who composed the Malolos Constitution.

Tanza is the home of Cavite Gateway Terminal, the first roll-on, roll-off barge terminal in the Philippines.

History

Tanza was formerly a strip of land incorporated for official purpose to the municipality of San Francisco de Malabon, now called General Trias. The first settlers were the Fabian brothers who migrated here. This place was particularly devoted to grazing and was called Estancia (1780).

In the mid-19th century, the Secularization movement led by Father Pedro Pelaez was largely centered in Santa Cruz de Malabón.

In 1914, Florentino Joya, the then-representative of Cavite to the Philippine Assembly, worked for the passage of a bill which renamed the town of Santa Cruz de Malabon to Tanza by virtue of Philippine Legislative Act No. 2390 dated February 28, 1914.

Tanza celebrated Araw ng Tanza 100th anniversary with a theme "Tanza, Sandaang Taon Na!" February 28, 2014 with a parade of Higante figures across the town proper with a fireworks display and a Lantern festival at evening.

Cityhood

Tanza, alongside with Silang is one of the 2 municipalities in Cavite that has already reached the requirements to become a new city in the province yet, no bills had been filed in the Congress.

Geography
The lowland municipality of Tanza is among of the 23 cities and municipalities that comprise the Province of Cavite. It is located in the Northwestern part of Cavite lying within latitudes 140 24’ north and longitude 120° 51’ east. It is bounded by the Municipality of Rosario to the North; the General Trias to the east; by Trece Martires City and the Municipality of Naic to the south; and Manila Bay on the west.

Barangays
Tanza is politically subdivided into 41 barangays.

Amaya 1
Amaya 2
Amaya 3
Amaya 4
Amaya 5
Amaya 6
Amaya 7
Bagtas
Biga
Biwas
Bucal
Bunga
Calibuyo
Capipisa
Daang Amaya 1
Daang Amaya 2
Daang Amaya 3
Halayhay
Julugan 1
Julugan 2
Julugan 3
Julugan 4
Julugan 5
Julugan 6
Julugan 7
Julugan 8
Lambingan
Mulawin
Paradahan 1 
Paradahan 2
Poblacion 1
Poblacion 2
Poblacion 3
Poblacion 4
Punta 1
Punta 2
Sahud Ulan
Sanja Mayor
Santol
Tanauan
Tres Cruses

Climate

Demographics

Religion
The majority of the people of Tanza are Roman Catholics, but there has been fast growth of other denominations in the region, including Iglesia ni Cristo, Baptist, Seventh-day Adventist, Jehovah's Witnesses, MCGI and Mormonism, Islam

Economy

Poverty incidence

Retail and business process outsourcing
Large retail operators have shown significant interest to the growth and increase of land value in cities throughout the Philippines. They are seen as highly developed urban centers where a lot of economic activities take place, and is important to urbanization and development. Tanza is eyed as a center of exponential growth for commerce, industry and service, strengthening its stature as one of the fastest growing municipality in Cavite province.

SM Supermalls, a subsidiary of SM Prime, the largest mall operator in the country, since 2014 is negotiating with other land owners nearby Antero Soriano Highway in Barangay Daang Amaya 2 on their plan to build a new SM Mall in the town. Clearing operations and fencing of the SM City Tanza site was started  from 2018 until the construction was started in May 2020. Mall blessing and ribbon-cutting ceremony held on October 13, a day before the mall grand opening on October 14, 2022, making it the seventh SM Supermall in Cavite and 80th in the country.

Municipal income

2009: Php.212,579,603.00
2010: Php.218,498,618.00
2011: Php.256,163,447.00
2012: Php.259,927,915.00
2013: Php.307,370,004.00
2014: Php.369,906,390.54
2015: Php.386,511,600.00
2016: Php.445,060,000.00
2020: Php.681,067,582.14
2021: Php.732,139,371.42

Government

Elected officials
The following are the elected officials of the town elected last May 9, 2022 which serves until June 30, 2025:

Municipal Government of Tanza (2022–2025):
 Representative (7th District): Vacant
 Mayor: Yuri A. Pacumio
 Vice Mayor: Arch Angelo B. Matro
 Sangguniang Bayan members:
 Sandy de Peralta-Go
 Angelito H. Langit  
 Maricel Del Rosario-Morales
 Sheryl Lyn Langit-Gervacio
  Niño Federico B. Matro
 Victor A. Murillo
  Alexis B. Dones
 Emilio A. Torres Jr.

List of former chief executives

Gobernadorcillos:
 Jose Cristobal (1870)
 Ignacio Fabian (1892)

Capitan Municipal:
 Jose del Rosario (1896)
 Francisco Valencia (1896)
 Eladio Bocalan (1896)
 Jacinto Pulido (1898)
 Ciriaco Montano (1898)

Presidente Municipal:

 Jacinto Pulido (1900)
 Eladio Bocalan (1900)
 Ciriaco Montano (1901)
 Jose del Rosario (1901)
 Hugo C. Arca (1905-1909)
 Pio A. Fojas (1910-1912)
 Pedro T. Montano (1912-1916)
 Marcus F. Figueroa (1916-1919
 Anselmo Vargas (1919)
 Cecilio N. Joya (1919-1925)
 Jose S. Sosa (1925-1928)
 Marcus F. Figueroa (1928-1934)

Municipal Mayor:

 Ladislao Joya (1934-1937)
 Jose S. Soriano (1937-1940)
 Hermogenes T. Arayata Sr. (1941-1942)
 Jose S. Soriano (1942-1943)
 Ramon del Rosario (1943-1944)
 Hermogenes T. Arayata Sr. (1945-1946)
 Rafael D. Alarca (1946-1947)
 Eustaquio Arayata (1947)
 Hermogenes T. Arayata Sr. (1948-1959)
 Hermogenes T. Pacumio (1960-1968)
 Timoteo Bocalan Sr. (1969-1978)
 Hermogenes F. Arayata Jr. (1978-1986)
 Roberto Colmenar (1986-1988)
 Hermogenes F. Arayata Jr. (1988-1998)
 Raymundo A. Del Rosario (1998-2007)
 Marcus Ashley C. Arayata (2007-2016)
 Yuri A. Pacumio (2016–present)

Education
Day care Centers 
There are 32 government-owned daycare centers in Tanza, which is being managed by the MSWD.

Elementary schools

High schools

Saint Augustine School (Junior and Senior High Campus)
Tanza National Comprehensive Highschool (TNCHS) 
Tanza Senior High School (TSHS)
Amaya School of Home and Industries (ASHI)
Tanza National Trade School - Main (TNTS-Main)
Tanza National Trade School - Annex (TNTS-Annex)
Our Lady of the Holy Rosary School (OLHRS)
Tanza Child Development Center (TCDC)
Hillcrest Periwinkle Montessori School (HPMS)
Holy Nazarene Christian School (HNCS)
De Roman Montessori School (DRMS)
Cavite Advanced Learning Academy (CALA)
Dei Gratia School, Inc. (DGSI)
Deo Roma College of Tanza (DRCT)
Maddalena Starace School (MSS)
Good Tree International School (GTIS)
Sawyer Integrated School (SIS)
The International School for Children (TISC)

Colleges
Cavite State University - Tanza Campus
Far East Asia Pacific Institute of Tourism Science and Technology (FEAPITSAT-main)
POWER School of Technology
Saint Joseph College - Tanza
PNTC Colleges Multi-Training Facility
Magsaysay Training Center
Lyceum of the Philippine University (Cavite Campus)

Notable personalities
Lyca Gairanod – The Voice Kids Philippines grand champion
Felipe Calderón – National hero; Father of the Malolos Constitution.
Epimaco Velasco – DILG Secretary; Cavite governor
Justiniano S. Montano – Senator; creator of Senate Blue Ribbon Committee 
Antero Soriano – Cavite governor; senator
Mars Ravelo – graphic novelist
Jasmine Trias – American Idol (3rd runner-up) 
Louise delos Reyes – actress and model
Josefino Cenizal – composer, most notably  Ang Pasko ay Sumapit
Olivia Cenizal – actress
Ranidel de Ocampo – basketball player
Yancy de Ocampo – basketball player
Aleona Denise Santiago – volleyball player
Jaja Santiago - volleyball player
Mikey Bustos - Filipino-Canadian vlogger

See also
List of renamed cities and municipalities in the Philippines
List of sister cities in the Philippines

References

External links

[ Philippine Standard Geographic Code]
Philippine Census Information

Municipalities of Cavite
Populated places on Manila Bay